Senegal competed at the 2020 Summer Paralympics in Tokyo, Japan, from 24 August to 5 September 2021.

Taekwondo

Senegal qualified three athletes to compete at the Paralympics competition. Ibrahima Seye Sen qualified by winning the gold medal at the 2020 African Qualification Tournament in Rabat, Morocco.

See also 
Senegal at the Paralympics
Senegal at the 2020 Summer Olympics

References 

Nations at the 2020 Summer Paralympics
2020
2021 in Senegalese sport